41 Seconds is a 2006 German film.

External links
 

2006 films
German comedy short films
2000s German-language films
2000s German films